Low Wooded Island is the name of an island 30 km south-east of Cape Flattery in the Great Barrier Reef Marine Park Authority and within the Three Islands National Park. The island is an important seabird nesting site. It is around 45 hectares or 0.45 square km in size.

See also

 List of islands of Australia

References

Islands on the Great Barrier Reef
Uninhabited islands of Australia
Islands of Far North Queensland
Great Barrier Reef Marine Park